The Pioneer School of Ariana, commonly known as LPA, is a secondary school located in "l'Avenue de l'Indépendance" in Ariana, Tunisia.

It is one of the most prestigious schools in Tunisia,  known for its high quality education and its highly competitive environment : 
it enjoys a success rate of 100% at the  Baccalaureate exam.
In 2018 it was ranked 1st regionally and 1st nationally .

History 
The school was founded on September 15, 1983, in the context of a policy aiming at uniting the elites in special schools. First, scientific subjects were taught in English but French soon substituted it, as is the case in the other Tunisian schools. Students used to get in at the age of twelve. At the time, the school had 7 different grades. But following educational reforms, the secondary education has been split into two parts, and students enter this school at the age 15, after achieving grades among the highest in the national 9th grade examination. This is the fact that makes it an elite school.

Principals 
To this day, the school has had nine principals:
1983-1989 : Habiba Soua
1989-2000 : Néjib Zaatour
2000-2008 : Hassen Zaghdidi
2008-2011 : Mondher Sghairi
2011-2011 : Saima Néji Ben Brahim
2011- 2012 : Ahmed Oueslati
nov. 2012-April 2013 : Zouhaier Idoudi
sept. 2013-sept. 2018 : Naïma Lajnef Bouafif
sept. 2018-... : Farhat Hmidi

References

External links 
 

Educational institutions established in 1983
Schools in Tunisia
1983 establishments in Tunisia